John Dutcher may refer to:
John B. Dutcher (1830–1911), American politician from New York
John R. Dutcher (born 1961), Canadian physicist